Parasaissetia nigra is a species of soft scale insect in the family Coccidae.

References

Further reading

 
 
 
 

Coccidae
Insects described in 1861